List of Masonic buildings identifies notable buildings around the world associated with Freemasonry.  Often these are significant landmarks in their towns or cities, and reflect the influence of Masons at one time.  Most are buildings built for exclusive or shared use by Masonic lodges, Grand Lodges or other Masonic bodies.  Many include original commercial space on ground or lower floors, with space intended for group meetings above.  (For a list of those within the United States, see: List of Masonic buildings in the United States)

Most of the buildings on this list were purpose-built to house Masonic lodge meetings and ritual activities.  In a few cases, Masonic bodies converted existing landmark buildings to Masonic use. Also included are buildings constructed by the Freemasons as part of their charitable endeavors (such as hospitals and schools).  This list is intended to include any building having some form of landmark status such as being listed on a heritage registers, and other notable ones as well.

Australia

New South Wales

Artarmon Masonic Centre, Artarmon - The original 1923 building was sold to a developer in the 1990s and demolished.
Dubbo Masonic Centre, Dubbo, built 1888, under renovation in 2021
Masonic Temple (c.1870), Illawarra, listed on the State Heritage Inventory
Maitland Lodge of Unity Masonic Hall and Lodge (1887), Maitland, listed on the State Heritage Inventory
Royal Arch Temple, Petersham, Sydney.  Its Egyptian Room, originally built within the Scottish Royal Arch Temple at 22-24 College Street Sydney in 1927 and later moved, is listed on the State Heritage Inventory
Sydney Masonic Centre, Sydney
Murwillumbah Masonic Temple, Murwillumbah, built in 1909

Queensland

 Barcaldine Masonic Temple, state-level registered
 Blackall Masonic Temple, state-level registered
Masonic Temple, Brisbane, Brisbane, state-level registered 
Cairns Masonic Temple, state-level registered
Charters Towers Masonic Lodge, state-level registered
Cooroora Masonic Temple - Pomona, Queensland , state-level registered </ref>
St George's Masonic Centre, Warwick, state-level registered
 Isis Masonic Lodge, Childers, state-level registered
 Mackay Masonic Temple, state-level registered
Townsville Masonic Hall, state-level registered
 Mount Morgan Masonic Temple, state-level registered 
 Mount Perry Masonic Lodge, state-level registered
 Rockhampton Masonic Hall, state-level registered
 Yangan Masonic Hall, state-level registered

South Australia
Freemasons Hall, North Terrace, Adelaide
Port Adelaide Masonic Hall, Port Adelaide (1927)

Victoria
Ballarat Masonic Centre, Ballarat
The Capital - Bendigo (formerly Bendigo Masonic Hall
Collingwood United Masonic Temple, Abbotsford
Creswick Masonic Centre, Creswick
Ivalda Masonic Temple, Darebin
Dallas Brooks Centre, Melbourne, concert hall built in 1969 as "Dallas Brooks Center", by the United Grand Lodge Victoria (UGLV).  Renamed in 1993.  A major events venue in Melbourne.  One of only two significant surviving brutalist strip architecture examples left in Australia, the other being the 1968-built National Library of Australia building in Canberra.
Freemasons Hospital, Melbourne - Listed on the Victorian Heritage Database. Originally constructed by the United Grand Lodge of Victoria as an "intermediate" or "community" hospital for Freemasons and their families. The hospital was purchased in 2006 by ING Real Estate in 2006, and leased to Epworth Healthcare.

Western Australia

Albany Masonic Hall, Albany
Masonic Temple (134 Burt Street, Kalgoorlie-Boulder), constructed 1901–02 in Federation Academic Classical style, "an expression of community wealth and prominence"
Masonic Temple (26 Egan Street, Kalgoorlie-Boulder), pink sandstone building constructed in 1899 in Federation Academic Classical style
 Freemasons Hotel (Toodyay)
Urwin's Store - Toodyay. The local Masonic Lodge rented the upstairs rooms from 1899 to 1924 before moving to its current premises.

Tasmania
Bothwell Masonic Hall, Bothwell
Deloraine Masonic Hall, Deloraine
Devonport Masonic Hall, Devonport
Franklin Masonic Hall, Franklin
Glenorchy Masonic Hall, Glenorchy
Hobart Masonic Centre, Hobart
Launceston Masonic Centre, Launceston
Lindisfarne Masonic Hall, Lindisfarne
New Norfolk Masonic Hall, New Norfolk
Newstead Masonic Hall, Newstead
North West Masonic Centre, Hillcrest
Oatlands Masonic Hall, Oatlands
Old Town Hall, Ross
Pembroke Masonic Hall, Sorell
Queenstown Masonic Hall, Queenstown
Scottsdale Masonic Hall, Scottsdale
Sheffield Masonic Hall, Sheffield
Wynyard Masonic Hall, Wynyard

Bermuda
 State House, St. George's - The oldest stone building in Bermuda, it housed Bermuda's Parliament from 1620 until 1815, when the capital was relocated to Hamilton. Since 1815 it has been leased in perpetuity to a Masonic Lodge.

Canada

Alberta
Masonic Hall Museum, on "1905 St" in Fort Edmonton Park, Edmonton

Newfoundland and Labrador
Masonic Temple (St. John's, Newfoundland and Labrador) - Designated a Registered Heritage Structure by the Heritage Foundation of Newfoundland and Labrador in April 1995. The building is currently owned by Spirit of Newfoundland, and used mainly by artists of all artistic genres, with the core business being dinner and show.

Ontario
 CTV Temple-Masonic Temple in Toronto — Added to the City of Toronto Heritage Property Inventory in 1974, and designated under the Ontario Heritage Act in 1997. Originally constructed as a Masonic Hall, the building has changed hands a number of times. From the 1960s through the 1990s, it housed a succession of live music clubs. Later in the 1990s, it was the home of Open Mike with Mike Bullard, and was one of CTV Toronto's news bureaus. From March 2006, the building became the broadcast home of the new MTV Canada.  On June 17, 2013, the building was purchased by the Info-Tech Research Group. Info-Tech announced that its plans for the building include staging an annual charity rock concert in the auditorium.

Quebec
 Montreal Masonic Memorial Templein Montreal — Prominent Beaux-Arts style building completed in 1930, a National Historic Site.

Denmark
 Freemasons' Hall, Copenhagen

Hong Kong
 Zetland Hall is the headquarters of the District Grand Lodge of Hong Kong and the Far East. Hong Kong Freemasons built the first Zetland Hall in 1865 and used it until it was destroyed in an air raid in 1944. In 1949 it was replaced by the second Zetland Hall.

India
 Goshamal Baradari, in Hyderabad, India, built in 1682, and donated to the fraternity in 1872 by the Nizam of Hyderabad,

Liberia

 Monrovia - During the First Liberian Civil War, the Grand Masonic Temple in Monrovia was the scene of many battles. and its ruins became home to 8000 squatters. The Masons managed to evict them by 2005 and the building was renovated in 2018.

Malaysia

In 1977, Malaysia had 55 lodges and 2,984 "expert" members.  Halls include:
Freemason Hall, 74 Jalan Chan Koon Cheng, Melaka
 Penang Masonic Temple, in Penang

New Zealand

Masonic Lodge, Poutu Road, Aratapu.  Built in the early 1900s, this was a category 2 historic place (#3869).  Lost to fire during 2003.
Arrow Kilwinning Lodge, 9 Wiltshire Street, Arrowtown.  Category 1 historic place (#2110), listed 10 December 2010.
Cromwell Kilwinning Lodge No 98, 69 Melmore Terrace, Cromwell.  Built in 1900.  Category 2 historic place (#2130), listed 22 June 2007.
 Masonic Hall, 21 Kimbolton Road, Feilding.  Built during 1897–98.  A category 2 historic place (#1230). A 1913 renovation added an Edwardian Free Classical style facade designed by C. Tilleard Natusch & Sons.  Lost to redevelopment during 2014.
Masonic Lodge, 132 Percival Street, Rangiora.  Brick, concrete and iron building with a facing of Oamaru Stone, this was a Category 2 historic place (#3785).  Damaged in Canterbury earthquakes, demolished in 2013.

Pakistan
 Masonic Temple, Lahore; meeting place for Lodge of Hope and Perseverance No. 782
 Freemasons Lodge Building, Karachi. Built by the Freemason's Trust before World War I; now used by the Sindh Wildlife Department Conservator; renovations began in circa 2008.

Philippines

Metro Manila
Plaridel Masonic Temple, Gen. Luna St, Paco, Manila
 Masonic Temple at Escolta, Manila, on the Pasig River, apparently the tallest building in the "Wall Street of the Philippines" area in the 1910s.
 Jacobo Zobel Masonic Temple, Makati
 Capitol Masonic Temple, Quezon City

Visayas
 Aklan Masonic Temple, Kalibo, Aklan
 Bacolod Masonic Temple, Bacolod, Negros Occidental
 Cebu Masonic Temple, Cebu City, Cebu
 Iloilo Masonic Temple, Iloilo City, Iloilo

Mindanao
 Maguindanao Masonic Temple, Cagayan de Oro
 Kitanglay Masonic Temple, Gimampang, Misamis Oriental

Singapore

Freemasons' Hall, 23A Coleman Street, Central Region English Renaissance style,

Spain

 Masonic Temple of Santa Cruz de Tenerife, Canary Islands

Sri Lanka
 Victoria Masonic Temple, Colombo

United Kingdom

England

 London
 Freemasons' Hall, London is the home of the United Grand Lodge of England
 Mark Masons' Hall
 Headquarters, Order of Women Freemasons, a 19th-century building at 27 Pembridge Gardens, Notting Hill, which is a Grade II listed building, that since 1924 has been home of Order of Women Freemasons
 Cheltenham Masonic Hall Grade II* listed.
 The Cloisters, Letchworth is a Grade II* listed building.
 The Hanging Chapel in Langport is a Grade I listed building and a Scheduled Ancient Monument that became a masonic hall in 1891.
 Old Orchard Street Theatre, Bath Theatre and church which became a masonic hall in 1865.
 Phoenix Lodge, Sunderland. A Grade I listed building with the longest continuous usage of a Masonic meeting place in the world.
 Royal Masonic School for Boys in Bushey, Hertfordshire.
 Royal Masonic School in Rickmansworth, Hertfordshire. (Chapel is Grade II listed).

Scotland
 The building used by Lodge Mother Kilwinning Kilwinning, Ayrshire, consecrated in 1893, includes a museum of Masonic artefacts. The lodge traces its history to the building of Kilwinning Abbey, circa 1140. The current lodge building replaced a lodge building that was erected in 1779.
 Pollokshields Burgh Hall in Glasgow, meeting place for Lodge Pollok, Pollokshields No. 772.

United States

References

External links

Architectural history lists
Lists of buildings and structures